Zionism as an organized movement is generally considered to have been founded by Theodor Herzl in 1897. However, the history of Zionism began earlier and is related to Judaism and Jewish history. The Hovevei Zion, or the Lovers of Zion, were responsible for the creation of 20 new Jewish towns in Palestine between 1870 and 1897.

The movement's central aim was the re-establishment of a Jewish national home and cultural centre in Palestine by facilitating Jewish return from diaspora, as well as the re-establishment of a Jewish state (usually defined as a secular state with a Jewish majority), attaining its goal in 1948 with the creation of Israel.

Since the creation of Israel, the importance of the Zionist movement as an organization has declined, as the Israeli state has grown stronger.

The Zionist movement continues to exist, working to support Israel, assist persecuted Jews and encourage Jewish emigration to Israel. Most Israeli political parties continue to define themselves as Zionist.

The success of Zionism has meant that the percentage of the world's Jewish population who live in Israel has steadily grown over the years and today 40% of the world's Jews live in Israel. There is no other example in human history of a nation being reestablished after such a long period of existence as a diaspora.

Background: The historic and religious origins of Zionism

Biblical precedents

The precedence for Jews to return to their ancestral homeland, motivated by strong divine intervention, first appears in the Torah, and thus later adopted in the Christian Old Testament. After Jacob and his sons had gone down to Egypt to escape a drought, they were enslaved and became a nation. Later, as commanded by God, Moses went before Pharaoh, demanded, "Let my people go!" and foretold severe consequences, if this was not done. Torah describes the story of the plagues and the Exodus from Egypt, which is estimated at about 1400 BCE, and the beginning of the journey of the Jewish People toward the Land of Israel. These are celebrated annually during Passover, and the Passover meal traditionally ends with the words "Next Year in Jerusalem."

The theme of return to their traditional homeland came up again after the Babylonians conquered Judea in 587 BCE and the Judeans were exiled to Babylon. In the book of Psalms (Psalm 137), Jews lamented their exile while Prophets like Ezekiel foresaw their return. The Bible recounts how, in 538 BCE Cyrus the Great of Persia conquered Babylon and issued a proclamation granting the people of Judah their freedom. 50,000 Judeans, led by Zerubbabel returned. A second group of 5000, led by Ezra and Nehemiah, returned to Judea in 456 BCE.

Precursors

The 613 Jewish revolt against Heraclius is considered the last serious Jewish attempt for gaining autonomy in Palestine in antiquity. In 1160 David Alroy led a Jewish uprising in Upper Mesopotamia that aimed to reconquer the promised land. In 1648 Sabbatai Zevi from modern Turkey claimed he would lead the Jews back to Palestine. At the beginning of the 19th century, the Perushim, disciples of the Vilna Gaon, left Lithuania to settle in the Land of Israel in anticipation of the return of the Messiah in 1840.  A dispatch from the British Consulate in Jerusalem in 1839 reported that "the Jews of Algiers and its dependencies, are numerous in Palestine..." There was also significant migration from Central Asia (Bukharan Jews).  In 1868 Judah ben Shalom led a large movement of Yemenite Jews to Palestine.

In addition to Messianic movements, the population of the Holy Land was slowly bolstered by Jews fleeing Christian persecution, especially after the so-called Reconquista of Al-Andalus (the Arabic name for the Iberian Peninsula). Safed became an important center of Kabbalah. Jerusalem, Hebron, and Tiberias also had significant Jewish populations.

Aliyah and the ingathering of the exiles

Among Jews in the Diaspora, Eretz Israel was revered in a cultural, national, ethnic, historical, and religious sense. They thought of a return to it in a future messianic age. Return remained a recurring theme among generations, particularly in Passover and Yom Kippur prayers, which traditionally concluded with "Next year in Jerusalem", and in the thrice-daily Amidah (Standing prayer).

Jewish daily prayers include many references to "your people Israel", "your return to Jerusalem" and associate salvation with a restored presence in the Land of Israel, the Land of Zion and Jerusalem (usually accompanied by a Messiah); for example the prayer Uva Letzion (Isaiah 59:20): "And a redeemer shall come to Zion..." Aliyah (return to Israel) has always been considered a praiseworthy act for Jews according to Jewish law and some Rabbis consider it one of the core 613 commandments in Judaism. From the Middle Ages and onwards, some famous rabbis (and often their followers) made aliyah to the Land of Israel. These included Nahmanides, Yechiel of Paris with several hundred of his students, Joseph ben Ephraim Karo, Menachem Mendel of Vitebsk and 300 of his followers, and over 500 disciples (and their families) of the Vilna Gaon known as Perushim, among others.

Persecution of the Jews

Persecution of Jews played a key role in preserving Jewish identity and keeping Jewish communities transient, it would later provide a key role in inspiring Zionists to reject European forms of identity.

Jews in Catholic states were banned from owning land and from pursuing a variety of professions. From the 13th century Jews were required to wear identifying clothes such as special hats or stars on their clothing. This form of persecution originated in tenth century Baghdad and was copied by Christian rulers. Constant expulsions and insecurity led Jews to adopt artisan professions that were easily transferable between locations (such as furniture making or tailoring).

Persecution in Spain and Portugal led large number of Jews there to convert to Christianity, however many continued to secretly practice Jewish rituals. The Church responded by creating the Inquisition in 1478 and by expelling all remaining Jews in 1492. In 1542 the inquisition expanded to include the Papal States. Inquisitors could arbitrarily torture suspects and many victims were burnt alive.

In 1516 the Republic of Venice decreed that Jews would only be allowed to reside in a walled-in area of town called the ghetto. Ghetto residents had to pay a daily poll tax and could only stay a limited amount of time. In 1555 the Pope decreed that Jews in Rome were to face similar restrictions. The requirement for Jews to live in Ghettos spread across Europe and Ghettos were frequently highly overcrowded and heavily taxed. They also provided a convenient target for mobs (pogrom). Jews were expelled from England in 1290. A ban remained in force that was only lifted when Oliver Cromwell overthrew the monarchy in 1649 (see Resettlement of the Jews in England).

Persecution of Jews began to decline following Napoleon's conquest of Europe after the French Revolution although the short lived Nazi Empire resurrected most practices.
In 1965 the Catholic Church formally excluded the idea of holding Jews collectively responsible for the death of Jesus.

Pre-Zionist Initiatives 1799–1897

The Enlightenment and the Jews

The Age of Enlightenment in Europe led to an 18th- and 19th-century Jewish enlightenment movement in Europe, called the Haskalah. In 1791, the French Revolution led France to become the first country in Europe to grant Jews legal equality. Britain gave Jews equal rights in 1856, Germany in 1871. The spread of western liberal ideas among newly emancipated Jews created for the first time a class of secular Jews who absorbed the prevailing ideas of enlightenment, including rationalism, romanticism, and nationalism.

However, the formation of modern nations in Europe accompanied changes in the prejudices against Jews. What had previously been religious persecution now became a new phenomenon of racial antisemitism and acquired a new name: antisemitism. Antisemites saw Jews as an alien religious, national and racial group and actively tried to prevent Jews from acquiring equal rights and citizenship. The Catholic press was at the forefront of these efforts and was quietly encouraged by the Vatican, which saw its own decline in status as linked to the equality granted to Jews. By the late 19th century, the more extreme nationalist movements in Europe often promoted physical violence against Jews who they regarded as interlopers and exploiters threatening the well-being of their nations.

Persecution in the Russian Empire

Jews in Eastern Europe faced constant pogroms and persecution in Tsarist Russia. From 1791 they were only allowed to live in the Pale of Settlement. In response to the Jewish drive for integration and modern education (Haskalah) and the movement for emancipation, the Tsars imposed tight quotas on schools, universities and cities to prevent entry by Jews. From 1827 to 1917 Russian Jewish boys were required to serve 25 years in the Russian army, starting at the age of 12. The intention was to forcibly destroy their ethnic identity, however the move severely radicalized Russia's Jews and familiarized them with nationalism and socialism.

The tsar's chief adviser Konstantin Pobedonostsev, was reported as saying that one-third of Russia's Jews was expected to emigrate, one-third to accept baptism, and one-third to starve.

Famous incidents includes the 1913 Menahem Mendel Beilis trial (Blood libel against Jews) and the 1903 Kishinev pogrom.

Between 1880 and 1928, two million Jews left Russia; most emigrated to the United States, a minority chose Palestine.

Proto-Zionism

Proto-Zionists include the (Lithuanian) Vilna Gaon, (Russian) Rabbi Menachem Mendel of Vitebsk, (Bosnian) Rabbi Judah Alkalai (German) Rabbi Zvi Hirsch Kalischer, and (British) Sir Moses Montefiore. Other advocates of Jewish independence include (American) Mordecai Manuel Noah, (Russian) Leon Pinsker and (German) Moses Hess.

The Vilna Gaon of Lithuania (1720-1797) promoted a teaching from the Zohar (book of Jewish mysticism) that “the gates of wisdom above and the founts of wisdom below will open” would happen after the start of the 6th century of the 6th millennium i.e. after the year 5600 of the Jewish calendar (1839-1840 AD). Many understood this to imply the coming of the Messiah at that time, and thus an early wave of Jewish migration to the Holy Land began in 1808 and grew until the 1840s.

In 1862 Moses Hess, a former associate of Karl Marx and Frederich Engels, wrote Rome and Jerusalem. The Last National Question calling for the Jews to create a socialist state in Palestine as a means of settling the Jewish question. Also in 1862, German Orthodox Rabbi Kalischer published his tractate Derishat Zion, arguing that the salvation of the Jews, promised by the Prophets, can come about only by self-help. In 1882, after the Odessa pogrom, Judah Leib Pinsker published the pamphlet Auto-Emancipation (self-emancipation), arguing that Jews could only be truly free in their own country and analyzing the persistent tendency of Europeans to regard Jews as aliens:
"Since the Jew is nowhere at home, nowhere regarded as a native, he remains an alien everywhere. That he himself and his ancestors as well are born in the country does not alter this fact in the least... to the living the Jew is a corpse, to the native a foreigner, to the homesteader a vagrant, to the proprietary a beggar, to the poor an exploiter and a millionaire, to the patriot a man without a country, for all a hated rival."

Pinsker established the Hibbat Zion movement to actively promote Jewish settlement in Palestine. In 1890, the "Society for the Support of Jewish Farmers and Artisans in Syria and Eretz Israel" (better known as the Odessa Committee) was officially registered as a charitable organization in the Russian Empire, and by 1897, it counted over 4,000 members.

Early British and American support for Jewish return

Ideas of the restoration of the Jews in the Land of Israel entered British public discourse in the early 19th century, at about the same time as the British Protestant Revival.

Not all such attitudes were favorable towards the Jews; they were shaped in part by a variety of Protestant beliefs, or by a streak of philo-Semitism among the classically educated British elite, or by hopes to extend the Empire. (See The Great Game)

At the urging of Lord Shaftesbury, Britain established a consulate in Jerusalem in 1838, the first diplomatic appointment in the city. In 1839, the Church of Scotland sent Andrew Bonar and Robert Murray M'Cheyne to report on the condition of the Jews there. The report was widely published and was followed by Memorandum to Protestant Monarchs of Europe for the restoration of the Jews to Palestine. In August 1840, The Times reported that the British government was considering Jewish restoration. Correspondence in 1841–42 between Moses Montefiore, the President of the Board of Deputies of British Jews and Charles Henry Churchill, the British consul in Damascus, is seen as the first recorded plan proposed for political Zionism.

Lord Lindsay wrote in 1847: "The soil of Palestine still enjoys her sabbaths, and only waits for the return of her banished children, and the application of industry, commensurate with her agricultural capabilities, to burst once more into universal luxuriance, and be all that she ever was in the days of Solomon."

In 1851, correspondence between Lord Stanley, whose father became British Prime Minister the following year, and Benjamin Disraeli, who became Chancellor of the Exchequer alongside him, records Disraeli's proto-Zionist views: "He then unfolded a plan of restoring the nation to Palestine—said the country was admirably suited for them—the financiers all over Europe might help—the Porte is weak—the Turks/holders of property could be bought out—this, he said, was the object of his life..." Coningsby was merely a feelermy views were not fully developed at that time—since then all I have written has been for one purpose. The man who should restore the Hebrew race to their country would be the Messiah—the real saviour of prophecy!" He did not add formally that he aspired to play this part, but it was evidently implied. He thought very highly of the capabilities of the country, and hinted that his chief object in acquiring power here would be to promote the return". 26 years later, Disraeli wrote in his article entitled "The Jewish Question is the Oriental Quest" (1877) that within fifty years, a nation of one million Jews would reside in Palestine under the guidance of the British.

Sir Moses Montefiore visited the Land of Israel seven times and fostered its development.

In 1842, Joseph Smith, founder of the Latter Day Saints movement, sent a representative, Orson Hyde, to dedicate the land of Israel for the return of the Jews. Protestant theologian William Eugene Blackstone submitted a petition to the US president in 1891; the Blackstone Memorial called for the return of Palestine to the Jews.

The first aliya

In the late 1870s, Jewish philanthropists such as the Montefiores and the Rothschilds responded to the persecution of Jews in Eastern Europe by sponsoring agricultural settlements for Russian Jews in Palestine. The Jews who migrated in this period are known as the First Aliyah. Aliyah is a Hebrew word meaning "ascent", referring to the act of spiritually "ascending" to the Holy Land and a basic tenet of Zionism.

The movement of Jews to Palestine was opposed by the Haredi communities who lived in the Four Holy Cities, since they were very poor and lived off charitable donations from Europe, which they feared would be used by the newcomers. However, from 1800 there was a movement of Sephardi businessmen from North Africa and the Balkans to Jaffa and the growing community there perceived modernity and Aliyah as the key to salvation. Unlike the Haredi communities, the Jaffa community did not maintain separate Ashkenazi and Sephardi institutions and functioned as a single unified community.

Founded in 1878, Rosh Pinna and Petah Tikva were the first modern Jewish settlements.

In 1881–1882 the Tsar sponsored a huge wave of pogroms in the Russian Empire and a massive wave of Jews began leaving, mainly for America. So many Russian Jews arrived in Jaffa that the town ran out of accommodation and the local Jews began forming communities outside the Jaffa city walls. However, the migrants faced difficulty finding work (the new settlements mainly needed farmers and builders) and 70% ultimately left, mostly moving on to America. One of the migrants in this period, Eliezer Ben-Yehuda set about modernizing Hebrew so that it could be used as a national language.

Rishon LeZion was founded on 31 July 1882 by a group of ten members of Hovevei Zion from Kharkov (today's Ukraine). Zikhron Ya'akov was founded in December 1882 by Hovevei Zion pioneers from Romania. In 1887 Neve Tzedek was built just outside Jaffa. Over 50 Jewish settlements were established in this period.

In 1890, Palestine, which was part of the Ottoman Empire, was inhabited by about half a million people, mostly Muslim and Christian Arabs, but also some dozens of thousands Jews.

Establishment of the Zionist movement 1897–1917

Formation
In 1883, Nathan Birnbaum, 19 years old, founded Kadimah, the first Jewish student association in Vienna and printed Pinsker's pamphlet Auto-Emancipation.

The Dreyfus Affair, which erupted in France in 1894, profoundly shocked emancipated Jews. The depth of antisemitism in the first country to grant Jews equal rights led many to question their future prospects among Christians. Among those who witnessed the Affair was an Austro-Hungarian Jewish journalist, Theodor Herzl. Herzl was born in Budapest and lived in Vienna (Jews were only allowed to live in Vienna from 1848), who published his pamphlet Der Judenstaat ("The Jewish State") in 1896 and Altneuland ("The Old New Land") in 1902. He described the Affair as a personal turning point. Seeing Dreyfus's Jewishness used so successfully as a scapegoat by the monarchist propagandists disillusioned Herzl. Dreyfus's guilt was deemed indisputable simply because Jewish stereotypes of nefariousness prevented a fair trial from occurring. Herzl outright denied that any such Jewish stereotypes were rooted in reality in any way. However, he believed that anti-semitism was so deeply ingrained in European society that only the creation of a Jewish state would enable the Jews to join the family of nations and escape antisemitism.

Herzl infused political Zionism with a new and practical urgency. He brought the World Zionist Organization into being and, together with Nathan Birnbaum, planned its First Congress at Basel in 1897.

The objectives of Zionism

During the First Zionist Congress, the following agreement, commonly known as the Basel Program, was reached:
Zionism seeks to establish a home for the Jewish people in Palestine secured under public law. The Congress contemplates the following means to the attainment of this end:
The promotion by appropriate means of the settlement in Palestine of Jewish farmers, artisans, and manufacturers.
The organization and uniting of the whole of Jewry by means of appropriate institutions, both local and international, in accordance with the laws of each country.
The strengthening and fostering of Jewish national sentiment and national consciousness.
Preparatory steps toward obtaining the consent of governments, where necessary, in order to reach the goals of Zionism.
"Under public law" is generally understood to mean seeking legal permission from the Ottoman rulers for Jewish migration. In this text the word "home" was substituted for "state" and "public law" for "international law" so as not to alarm the Ottoman Sultan.

The organizational structure of the Zionist movement

For the first four years, the World Zionist Organization (WZO) met every year, then, up to the Second World War, they gathered every second year. Since the creation of Israel, the Congress has met every four years.

Congress delegates were elected by the membership. Members were required to pay dues known as a "shekel". At the congress, delegates elected a 30-man executive council, which in turn elected the movement's leader. The movement was democratic and women had the right to vote, which was still absent in Great Britain in 1914.

The WZO's initial strategy was to obtain permission from the Ottoman Sultan Abdul Hamid II to allow systematic Jewish settlement in Palestine. The support of the German Emperor, Wilhelm II, was sought, but unsuccessfully. Instead, the WZO pursued a strategy of building a homeland through persistent small-scale immigration and the founding of such bodies as the Jewish National Fund (1901—a charity that bought land for Jewish settlement) and the Anglo-Palestine Bank (1903—provided loans for Jewish businesses and farmers).

Cultural Zionism and opposition to Herzl 

Herzl's strategy relied on winning support from foreign rulers, in particular the Ottoman Sultan. He also made efforts to cultivate Orthodox rabbinical support. Rabbinical support depended on the Zionist movement making no challenges to existing Jewish tradition. However, an opposition movement arose that emphasized the need for a revolution in Jewish thought. While Herzl believed that the Jews needed to return to their historic homeland as a refuge from antisemitism, the opposition, led by Ahad Ha'am, believed that the Jews must revive and foster a Jewish national culture and, in particular strove to revive the Hebrew language. Many also adopted Hebraized surnames. The opposition became known as Cultural Zionists. Important Cultural Zionists include Ahad Ha'am, Chaim Weizmann, Nahum Sokolow and Menachem Ussishkin.

The "Uganda" proposal
In 1903, the British Colonial Secretary, Joseph Chamberlain, suggested the British Uganda Programme, land for a Jewish state in "Uganda" (in today's Uasin Gishu District, Eldoret, Kenya). Herzl initially rejected the idea, preferring Palestine, but after the April 1903 Kishinev pogrom, Herzl introduced a controversial proposal to the Sixth Zionist Congress to investigate the offer as a temporary measure for Russian Jews in danger. Despite its emergency and temporary nature, the proposal proved very divisive, and widespread opposition to the plan was fueled by a walkout led by the Russian Jewish delegation to the Congress. Nevertheless, a committee was established to investigate the possibility, which was eventually dismissed in the Seventh Zionist Congress in 1905. After that, Palestine became the sole focus of Zionist aspirations.

Israel Zangwill left the main Zionist movement over this decision and founded the Jewish Territorialist Organization (ITO). The territorialists were willing to establish a Jewish homeland anywhere, but failed to attract significant support and were dissolved in 1925.

The Protocols of the Elders of Zion
 
In 1903, following the Kishinev Pogrom, a variety of Russian antisemities, including the Black Hundreds and the Tsarist Secret Police, began combining earlier works alleging a Jewish plot to take control of the world into new formats. One particular version of these allegations, "The Protocols of the Elders of Zion" (subtitle "Protocols extracted from the secret archives of the central chancery of Zion"), arranged by Sergei Nilus, achieved global notability. In 1903, the editor claimed that the protocols revealed the menace of Zionism:

The book contains fictional minutes of an imaginary meeting in which alleged Jewish leaders plotted to take over the world. Nilus later claimed they were presented to the elders by Herzl (the "Prince of Exile") at the first Zionist congress. A Polish edition claimed they were taken from Herzl's flat in Austria and a 1920 German version renamed them "The Zionist Protocols".

The death of Herzl
By 1904, cultural Zionism was accepted by most Zionists and a schism was beginning to develop between the Zionist movement and Orthodox Judaism. In 1904, Herzl died unexpectedly at the age of 44 and the leadership was taken over by David Wolffsohn, who led the movement until 1911. During this period, the movement was based in Berlin (Germany's Jews were the most assimilated) and made little progress, failing to win support among the Young Turks after the collapse of the Ottoman Regime. From 1911 to 1921, the movement was led by Dr. Otto Warburg.

Zionism breaks with Orthodox Judaism and moves towards Communism

Jewish Orthodox and Reform opposition
Under Herzl's leadership, Zionism relied on Orthodox Jews for religious support, with the main party being the orthodox Mizrachi. However, as the cultural and socialist Zionists increasingly broke with tradition and used language contrary to the outlook of most religious Jewish communities, many orthodox religious organizations began opposing Zionism. Their opposition was based on its secularism and on the grounds that only the Messiah could re-establish Jewish rule in Israel. Therefore, most Orthodox Jews maintained the traditional Jewish belief that while the Land of Israel was given to the ancient Israelites by God, and the right of the Jews to that land was permanent and inalienable, the Messiah must appear before the land could return to Jewish control.

Prior to the Holocaust, Reform Judaism rejected Zionism as inconsistent with the requirements of Jewish citizenship in the diaspora. The opposition of Reform Judaism was expressed in the Pittsburgh Platform, adopted by the Central Conference of American Rabbis in 1885: "We consider ourselves no longer a nation but a religious community, and therefore expect neither a return to Palestine, nor a sacrificial worship under the administration of the sons of Aaron, nor the restoration of any of the laws concerning the Jewish state."

The second aliya

Widespread pogroms accompanied the 1905 Russian Revolution, inspired by the Pro-Tsarist Black Hundreds. In Odessa, Leon Trotsky provided arms so the Zionists could protect the Jewish community and this prevented a pogrom. Zionist leader Jabotinsky eventually led the Jewish resistance in Odessa. During his subsequent trial Trotsky produced evidence that the police had organized the effort to create a pogrom in Odessa.

The vicious pogroms led to a wave of immigrants to Palestine. This new wave expanded the Revival of the Hebrew language. In 1909 a group of 65 Zionists laid the foundations for a modern city in Palestine. The city was named after the Hebrew title of Herzl's book "The Old New Land" - Tel-Aviv.  Tel Aviv had a modern "scientific" school, the Herzliya Hebrew High School, the first such school to teach only in Hebrew. All the cities affairs were conducted in Hebrew.

In Jerusalem, foundations were laid for a Jewish University (the Hebrew University), one that would teach only in Hebrew and that the Zionists hoped would help them prove their usefulness to the Turks (this did not come to fruition until 1918). In Haifa, the cornerstone was laid for a Jewish Technical school, the Technion – Israel Institute of Technology.

Jewish migrants and organizations began making large land purchases, in particular buying malarial swamps (of which there were many) and draining them to produce highly fertile land.

In 1909 a socialist commune was given some land near the Sea of Galilee, forming the first Kibbutz, Degania. There were nine members, two of them women.  One of the women was a former Narodnik who had volunteered as a nurse during the Balkan Wars and witnessed maltreatment of Jews by Russian troops.  Her son, the second child to be born on the Kibbutz, was General Moshe Dayan, who commanded Israeli troops in the 1956 war then was Minister of Defence during the Six Day War.

The Bund 
In Eastern Europe the General Jewish Labour Bund called for Jewish autonomy within Eastern Europe and promoted Yiddish as the Jewish national language. Like Zionism, the Bund was founded in 1897 and it was one of the largest socialist movements in Europe, however it did not grow as fast as Zionism. The Bund campaigned for Jewish autonomy and recognition of Jewish (non-territorial) national rights within a post-socialist Russia. Initially the Bund included Zionist Socialist parties but over time the leadership came to oppose Zionism and Orthodox Judaism. The socialist movement recognized various national groups, but the Jews were not one of them. The socialist movement was generally unwilling to combat worker anti-Semitism and often failed to publicly condemn pogroms.

Socialist Zionism 

Socialist Zionists believed that the Jews' centuries of being oppressed in anti-Semitic societies had reduced Jews to a meek, despairing existence that invited further antisemitism. They argued that Jews should redeem themselves by becoming farmers, workers, and soldiers in a country of their own. Socialist Zionists rejected religion as perpetuating a "Diaspora mentality" among the Jewish people and established rural communes in Israel called "Kibbutzim". Major theoreticians of Socialist Zionism included Moses Hess, Nachman Syrkin, Ber Borochov and A. D. Gordon, and leading figures in the movement included David Ben-Gurion and Berl Katznelson. Socialist Zionists rejected Yiddish as a language of exile, embracing Hebrew as the language that was common to all Jewish communities and which originated in Israel.

Gordon believed that the Jews lacked a "normal" class structure and that the various classes that constitute a nation had to be created artificially. Socialist Zionists therefore set about becoming Jewish peasants and proletarians and focused on settling land and working on it. According to Gordon "the land of Israel is bought with labour: not with blood and not with fire."  He called on Jews to embrace a "religion of labour" as opposed to their existing religion. Socialist Zionism became a dominant force in Israel, however, it exacerbated the schism between Zionism and Orthodox Judaism.

Socialist Zionists formed youth movements that became influential organizations in their own right including Habonim Dror, Hashomer Hatzair, HaNoar HaOved VeHaLomed and Machanot Halolim. During British rule the lack of available immigration permits to Palestine led the youth movements to operate training programs in Europe, which prepared Jews for migration to Palestine. As a Socialist-Zionist immigrants arrived already speaking Hebrew, trained in agriculture and prepared for life in Palestine.

Zionism and Feminism
The Zionist movement never restricted female suffrage. In 1911, Zionist activist Hannah Meisel Shochat established Havat Ha'Almot (lit. "the girls' farm") to train Zionist women in farming. The famous poet Rachel Bluwstein was one of the graduates. Zionist settlers were usually young and far from their families so a relatively permissive culture was able to develop. Within the Kibbutz movement child rearing was done communally thus freeing women to work (and fight) alongside the men.

The Zionist Roza Pomerantz-Meltzer was the first woman elected to the Sejm, the Parliament of Poland.  She was elected in 1919 as a member of a Zionist party.
In Mandatory Palestine women in Jewish towns could vote in elections before women won the right to vote in Britain.

Zionism in the Arab World
The 1911 edition of the Jewish Encyclopedia noted the movement's spread: "not only in the number of Jews affiliated with the Zionist organization and congress, but also in the fact that there is hardly a nook or corner of the Jewish world in which Zionistic societies are not to be found."

Support for Zionism was not a purely European and Ashkenazi phenomenon. In the Arab world, the first Zionist branches opened in Morocco only a few years after the Basel conference, and the movement became popular among Jews living within the Arab and Muslim world where Jews generally faced religious discrimination, prejudice and occasional violence. A number of the founders of the city of Tel Aviv were early Moroccan Jewish immigrants and Ottoman Salonika had a vigorous Zionist movement by 1908.

Early Zionism and the non-Jewish population of Palestine

Before 1917, Palestine's Arab population mostly saw themselves as Ottoman subjects. They feared the objectives of the Zionist movement, but they assumed the movement would fail. After the Young Turk revolution in 1908, Arab Nationalism grew rapidly in the area and most Arab Nationalists regarded Zionism as a threat, although a minority perceived Zionism as providing a path to modernity.

The Zionist Movement in World War I and the Balfour Declaration

The Jewish population of the USA increased about ten times between 1880 and 1920, with the immigration of poorer, more liberal and radical, "downtown", Eastern European immigrants fleeing persecution in contrast to the older generations of German, Spanish and Portuguese Jews that were much more conservative and rich. It was not until 1912, when the secular "people's lawyer" Louis Brandeis became involved in Zionism, just before the First World War, that Zionism gained significant support. By 1917, the American Provisional Executive Committee for General Zionist Affairs, which Brandeis chaired, had increased American Zionist membership ten times to 200,000 members; "American Jewry thenceforth became the financial center for the world Zionist movement".

As in the US, England had experienced a rapid growth in their Jewish minority. About 150,000 Jews migrated there from Russia in the period 1881–1914. With this immigration influx, pressure grew from British voters to halt it; added to the established knowledge in British society of Old Testament scripture, Zionism became an attractive solution for both Britain and the Empire.

In the search for support, Herzl, before his death, had made the most progress with the German Kaiser, joining him on his 1898 trip to Palestine. At the outbreak of war in 1914, the offices of the Zionist Organization were located in Berlin and led by Otto Warburg, a German citizen. With different national sections of the movement supporting different sides in the war, Zionist policy was to maintain strict neutrality and "to demonstrate complete loyalty to Turkey", the German ally controlling Palestine. Following Turkey's entry into World War I in August however, the Zionists were expelled from Tel Aviv and its environs.

David Ben-Gurion and Yitzhak Ben-Tzvi both volunteered for the Turkish Army but were rejected and exiled to Egypt. They moved to the US and tried to recruit Jews to set up a Jewish unit in the Turkish army.

Although 500,000 Russian Jews were serving in the Russian army, the Russian leadership regarded all Jews as their enemies and assumed that most were avoiding the draft. In 1915, following German advances in the Baltic provinces, the Russian military leadership accused the Jews of being a German fifth column and ordered 500,000 to leave their homes in the Pale of Settlement, mostly with less than 24 hours notice, and to relocate in central Russia. An estimated 100,000 died of starvation and exposure and their plight contributed to the disintegration of the Russian army.

In the United States, still officially neutral, most Russian and German Jews supported the Germans, as did much of the largely anti-British Irish American and German American community. Britain was anxious to win US support for its war effort, and winning over Jewish financial and popular support in the US was considered vital. With Tsarist Russia on the Allied side, most Jews supported Germany and in much of Eastern Europe the advancing Germans were regarded as liberators by the Jews. Like the Germans and the Russians, the British assumed that most Jews were avoiding the draft; these beliefs were groundless, but the Polish Zionist Ze'ev Jabotinsky was able to exploit it to promote a Jewish division in the British army. For the British, the Jewish Legion, was a means of recruiting Russian Jewish immigrants (who were mostly Zionists) to the British war effort. The legion was dominated by Zionist volunteers.

In January 1915, two months after the British declaration of war against the Ottomans, Zionist and British cabinet member Herbert Samuel presented a detailed memorandum entitled The Future of Palestine to the British Cabinet on the benefits of a British protectorate over Palestine to support Jewish immigration.

The most prominent Russian-Zionist migrant in Britain was chemist Chaim Weizmann. Weizmann developed a new process to produce acetone, a critical ingredient in manufacturing explosives that Britain was unable to manufacture in sufficient quantity. In 1915, the British government fell as a result of its inability to manufacture enough artillery shells for the war effort. In the new government, David Lloyd George became the minister responsible for armaments, and asked Weizmann to develop his process for mass production.

Lloyd George was an evangelical Christian and pro-Zionist. According to Lloyd George, when he asked Weizmann about payment for his efforts to help Britain, Weizmann told him that he wanted no money, just the rights over Palestine. Weizmann became a close associate of Lloyd George (Prime Minister from 1916) and the First Lord of the Admiralty (Foreign Secretary from 1916), Arthur Balfour.

In 1916 Hussein bin Ali, Sharif of Mecca (in Arabia), began an "Arab Revolt" hoping to create an Arab state in the Middle East. In the McMahon–Hussein Correspondence British representatives promised they would allow him to create such a state (the boundaries were vague). They also provided him with large sums of money to fund his revolt.

In February 1917 the tsar was overthrown and Alexander Kerensky became Prime Minister of the Russian Empire. Jews were prominent in the new government and the British hoped that Jewish support would help keep Russia in the war. In June 1917 the British army, led by Edmund Allenby, invaded Palestine. The Jewish Legion participated in the invasion and Jabotinsky was awarded for bravery. Arab forces conquered Transjordan and later took over Damascus.

In August 1917, as the British cabinet discussed the Balfour Declaration, Edwin Samuel Montagu, the only Jew in the British Cabinet and a staunch anti-Zionist, "was passionately opposed to the declaration on the grounds that (a) it was a capitulation to anti-Semitic bigotry, with its suggestion that Palestine was the natural destination of the Jews, and that (b) it would be a grave cause of alarm to the Muslim world". Additional references to the future rights of non-Jews in Palestine and the status of Jews worldwide were thus inserted by the British cabinet, reflecting the opinion of the only Jew within it. As the draft was finalized, the term "state" was replaced with "home", and comments were sought from Zionists abroad. Louis Brandeis, a member of the US Supreme Court, influenced the style of the text and changed the words "Jewish race" to "Jewish people".

On November 2, the British Foreign Secretary, Arthur Balfour, made his landmark Balfour Declaration, publicly expressing the government's view in favour of "the establishment in Palestine of a national home for the Jewish people", and specifically noting that its establishment must not "prejudice the civil and religious rights of existing non-Jewish communities in Palestine, or the rights and political status enjoyed by Jews in any other country".

The Russian Revolution and the disintegration of the Bund
On November 7, five days after the Balfour declaration, the Bolsheviks took over Russia. The Bolshevik seizure of power led to civil war in Russia and the collapse of the Western part of the Russian Empire.  Poland, the Ukraine and the Lithuanian states became independent. The collapse of central authority led to an eruption of pogroms across Russia and all the new militias were happy to attack the defenceless Jews.  The exception were the Bolsheviks, who (usually) took measures to stop their forces massacring Jews and this led to Jews siding with, and volunteering for the Bolshevik's Red Army which came under the command of Leon Trotsky, who was of Jewish origin.

Half the world's Jews lived within the confines of the Russian Empire in 1917, and of these, a third lived in the Ukraine. Simon Petlyura became commander of the Ukrainian Nationalist forces and these forces, as did the anti-Bolshevik White Russian troops, took to systematically massacring Jews. Between 1918 and 1921, when the Bolsheviks assumed control of the Ukraine, over 50,000 Jews were killed, a further 100,000 were permanently maimed or died of wounds and 200,000 Jewish children became orphans.
Israel Zangwill wrote:
It is as Bolsheviks that the Jews of South Russia have been massacred by the armies of Petlyura, though the armies of Sokolow have massacred them as partisans of Petlyura, the armies of Makhno as bourgeois capitalists, the armies of Hryhoriv as Communists, and the armies of Denikin at once as Bolsheviks, capitalists and Ukrainian nationalists. 

At the time of the Russian revolution, the Bund had 30,000 members in Russia, compared to 300,000 Zionist members of which about 10% were Marxist-Zionists. Joseph Stalin was the first People's Commissariat of Nationalities and in this role disbanded the Bund. Most of its members joined the Yevsektsia, a Jewish section of the Bolshevik organization created by Stalin which worked to end Jewish communal and religious life.

Members of the Marxist Zionist movement, Poale Zion led by Ber Borochov, returned to Russia (from Palestine) and requested to form Jewish Brigades within the Red Army. Trotsky supported the request but opposition from the Yevsektsia led to the proposal's failure. Poale Zion continued to exist in the USSR until 1928. Future Israeli Prime Minister David Ben-Gurion was a member of the Israeli branch of the movement.

In 1921, following a personal request to Stalin by the Soviet author Maxim Gorky, the Hebrew poets Bialik and Shaul Tchernichovsky were allowed to emigrate to Palestine. Bialik became the Israeli national poet. Despite opposition from the Evsektsiya, Stalin also permitted funding of a Hebrew theatre troupe in Moscow, called Habima. Konstantin Stanislavski attended the first night and the group put on a historic play called The Dybbuk, which they were allowed to take on tour in Europe. The tour terminated in Tel Aviv, and Habima never returned to Moscow, becoming instead the Israel National Theatre. The Revolution was accompanied by a brief flowering of Yiddish arts before being decimated by censorship and by 1950 a significant number of prominent Yiddish intellectuals had been sent to the Gulag. A Soviet census found that 90% of Belorussian Jews and 76% of Ukrainian Jews gave Yiddish as their mother tongue.

Between 1922 and 1928, the Soviets embarked on a plan of moving Ukrainian Jews to agricultural communes, mainly in Crimea.  The plan was encouraged by donations from US Jewish charities trying to protect and help Jews.  A number of Zionist agricultural collectives were established in Crimea in preparation for Kibbutz life.  Soviet leader Mikhail Kalinin considered creating a Jewish state in Crimea which had a large Karaite population who had been exempt from Tsarist persecution. (Karaites are Jews who reject the authority of the Talmud.)

In 1924 Stalin became the ruler of the USSR. In 1928 a Jewish Autonomous Oblast was created in the Russian Far East with Yiddish as an official language and Hebrew was outlawed: The only language to be outlawed in the USSR. Few Jews were tempted by the Soviet Jewish Republic and as of 2002 Jews constitute only about 1.2% of its population.

The Yevsektsiyas were disbanded in 1927 and many their leaders perished during the Great Purge. The Bund survived in independent Poland until the Second World War, when its membership was exterminated by the Nazis.

The British Mandate and the struggle for Palestine 1918–1939

Weizmann becomes leader

In late 1921, the 12th Zionist congress was held in Carlsbad, Czechoslovakia; it was the first congress to be held since 1913, because of World War I. Four hundred-fifty delegates attended, representing 780,000 fee paying Zionist members worldwide.  Weizmann was elected its president in recognition of his role in obtaining the Balfour Declaration. The conference passed a proposal for an "Arab-Jewish Entente", which called on Zionist leadership to "forge a true understanding with the Arab nation". Weizmann led the movement until 1931. From 1931 to 1935 the WZO was presided by Nahum Sokolow (who had also spent the First World War in Britain). Weizmann resumed presidency of the WZO in 1935 and led it until 1946.

Zionist Congresses:
1929 16th Congress, Zurich: 604,000 fee paying members.
1931 17th Congress, Basel: 670,000 fee paying members.
1933 18th Congress, Prague: 828,000 fee paying members.

The League of Nations endorses Zionism

After the defeat and dismantling of the Ottoman Empire by European colonial powers in 1918, the League of Nations endorsed the full text of the Balfour Declaration and established the British Mandate for Palestine (Full text:).

In addition to accepting the Balfour Declaration policy statement, the League included that "[a]n appropriate Jewish agency shall be recognised as a public body for the purpose of advising and co-operating with the Administration of Palestine...." This inclusion paralleled a similar proposal made by the Zionist Organization during the Paris Peace Conference.

The Zionist movement entered a new phase of activity. Its priorities were encouraging Jewish settlement in Palestine, building the institutional foundations of a Jewish state and raising funds for these purposes. The 1920s did see a steady growth in the Jewish population and the construction of state-like Jewish institutions, but also saw the emergence of Palestinian Arab nationalism and growing resistance to Jewish immigration.

Expansion of the movement: the third and fourth aliya
The success of Zionism in getting international recognition for its project led to growth in the membership and development of new forms of Zionism. The period 1919–1923 saw migration by Jews escaping the civil war in Russia, the period 1924–1929 migration by Jews escaping antisemitic regimes in Poland and Hungary.

Religious Zionism

In the 1920s and 1930s, Rabbi Abraham Isaac Kook (the first Chief Rabbi of Palestine) and his son Zevi Judah, began to develop the concept of Religious Zionism. Kook was concerned that growing secularism of Zionist supporters and increasing antagonism towards the movement from the largely non-Zionist Orthodox community might lead to a schism between them and sought to create a brand of Zionism that would serve as a bridge between Jewish Orthodoxy and secular Jewish Zionists.

The Religious Zionists established a youth movement called Bnei Akiva in 1929, and a number of Religious Kibbutzim.

Revisionist Zionism

The Revisionist Zionists were established in 1923 and originally led by Ze'ev Jabotinsky. After his involvement against the 1929 Arab riots, the British banned Jabotinsky from re-entering Palestine, and until his death in 1940, he advocated the more militant revisionist ideology in Europe and America. In 1935, he and the Revisionists left the mainstream Zionist Organization and formed the New Zionist Organization. Following mainstream Zionism's' acceptance of their earlier militant demand for a Jewish state they eventually rejoined in 1946.

During this period, Revisionist Zionism was detested by the competing Socialist Zionist movement, which saw them as being capitalist and influenced by Fascism; the movement also caused a great deal of concern among Arab Palestinians.

Revisionism was popular in Poland but lacked large support in Palestine. The Revisionists refused to comply with British quotas on Jewish migration, and, following the election of Hitler in Germany, the Revisionist youth movements HeHalutz and Beitar began to organize illegal Jewish migration to Palestine. In Europe and America they advocated pressing Britain to allow mass Jewish emigration and the formation of a Jewish Army in Palestine. The army would force the Arab population to accept mass Jewish migration and promote British interests in the region.

Zionism and the Arabs
Arab nationalists predominantly perceived Zionism as a threat to their own aspirations. This sense was heightened, by the growth of Zionist labor movement and its "Hebrew labor" program. The latter was an effort to increase Jewish immigrant employment, secure the creation of a Jewish proletariat, and to prevent Zionist settlement from turning into a standard colonial enterprise. Initially, it sought to develop separate settlements and economies and campaigned for the exclusive employment of Jews; it later campaigned against the employment of Arabs. Its adverse effects on the Arab majority were increasingly noted by the mandatory administration.

In 1919 Hashemite Emir Faisal, signed the Faisal–Weizmann Agreement. He wrote: We Arabs, especially the educated among us, look with the deepest sympathy on the Zionist movement. Our delegation here in Paris is fully acquainted with the proposals submitted yesterday by the Zionist organization to the Peace Conference, and we regard them as moderate and proper.
In their first meeting in June 1918 Weizmann had assured Faisal that the Jews did not propose to set up a government of their own but wished to work under British protection, to colonize and develop Palestine without encroaching on any legitimate interests

Initially Palestinian Arabs looked to the Arab-nationalist leaders to create a single Arab state, however Faisal's agreement with Weizmann led Palestinian-Arabs to develop their own brand of nationalism and call for Palestine to become a state governed by the Arab majority, in particular they demanded an elected assembly.

Zionist supporters were by now aware of Arab opposition, and this led the movement in 1921 to pass a motion calling on the leadership to "forge a true understanding with the Arab nation".

The Mufti and the emergence of Palestinian Nationalism

In 1921, Mohammad Amin al-Husayni was appointed as Grand Mufti of Jerusalem by the Palestine High Commissioner Herbert Samuel, after he had been pardoned for his role in the 1920 Palestine riots. During the following decades, he became the focus of Palestinian opposition to Zionism.

The Mufti believed that Jews were seeking to rebuild the Temple in Jerusalem on the site of the Dome of the Rock and Al-Aqsa Mosque. This led to a long confrontation over the use of the Kotel, also known as the Wailing Wall, which was owned by the Muslim authorities but was sacred to Jews.

Religious tension, an international economic crisis (affecting crop prices) and nationalist tension (over Zionist immigration) led to the 1929 Palestine riots. In these religious-nationalist riots Jews were massacred in Hebron and the survivors forced to leave the town. Devastation also took place in Safed and Jerusalem.

In 1936 an Arab uprising occurred, which lasted for three years. The Supreme Muslim Council in Palestine, led by the Mufti, organized the revolt. During the revolt the Mufti was forced to flee to Iraq, where he was involved in a pro-Nazi coup during which the Jewish areas of Baghdad were subjected to a pogrom.

In 1939 he rejected as insufficient the British White Paper, which imposed restrictions on Jewish immigration and land acquisition by Jews.

After the British reoccupied Iraq the Mufti joined the Nazis. He worked with Himmler and aided the SS his main role was broadcasting propaganda and recruiting Muslims, primarily for the Waffen SS in Bosnia.

In 1948 the Mufti returned to Egypt. He was involved in the short-lived All-Palestine Government sponsored by Egypt but was sidelined by most of the Arab countries.

Roosevelt-Ibn Saud correspondence
As the Second World War was drawing to its close, the King of Saudi Arabia expressed his concern in a letter to US President Franklin D. Roosevelt lest the US support for Zionism will infringe on the rights of the Arabs of Palestine. On April 5, 1945, the President replied in a letter to the King that
I would take no action, in my capacity as Chief of the Executive Branch of this Government, which might prove hostile to the Arab people.
Following Roosevelt's death, the Truman administration publicly adhered to the policy announced in the letter in an official statement released on October 18, 1945.

Growing conflict with the Palestinian Arab population
One issue fatally divided Arab and Jew in Palestine: immigration. Jews would not compromise over immigration, which they needed as a means of escaping European persecution and which was a core doctrine of Zionism. The Arabs for their part could not compromise on immigration because to do so would effectively end their majority in Palestine. As time went on the conflict between the two communities became increasingly bitter.

British immigration restrictions
British support for Zionism was always controversial and the issue was periodically debated in Parliament.

Churchill also restricted Jewish migration to an annual quota decided by the British. Certificates allowing migration were distributed by the Jewish Agency. Jews with 1000 Pounds in cash or Jewish professionals with 500 Pounds in cash could emigrate freely. Churchill's reforms made it hard for Arab Jews, Orthodox Jews and Revisionist Zionists from Poland to migrate to Palestine as the Jewish Agency was dominated by European Zionists, and increasingly by Socialist Zionists. Immigration restrictions did, however mean that Jewish immigrants to Palestine had to prove their loyalty and dedication by spending years preparing for migration. Many immigrants arrived after rigorous preparation including agricultural and ideological training and learning Hebrew.

The rise of Hitler: the Fifth Aliyah and illegal migration

During the 1920s concerns about antisemitism increased across Europe. By 1928, nations were increasingly legislating immigration, which at times prevented Jews from entering, and some of the new European states, established after the First World War, perceived Jewish immigrants as a threat to their political stability. Many countries feared that immigrating Jews from the east would bring revolutionary political ideas with them; Jews were also perceived as being a negative moral influence on society.

The rise to power of Adolf Hitler in Germany in 1933 produced a powerful new impetus for increased Zionist support and immigration to Palestine. The long-held assimilationist and non-Zionist view that Jews could live securely as minorities in European societies was deeply undermined, since Germany had been regarded previously as the country in which Jews had been most successfully integrated. With nearly all other countries closed to Jewish immigration, a new wave of migrants headed for Palestine. Those unable to pay the fees required for immediate entry by the British had to join the waiting lists.

Nazi efforts to induce Jews to leave Germany were made, but were undermined by their refusal to allow them to take their property also. In response, Haim Arlozorov of the Jewish Agency negotiated the Haavara Agreement with the Nazis, whereby German Jews could buy and then export German manufactured goods to Palestine. In Palestine the goods were later sold and the income returned to the migrants. As a result of this agreement, the influx of capital gave a much-needed economic boost in the midst of the great depression. Arlozorov, however, was assassinated shortly after his return, it was generally believed by members of the Irgun (in recent years it has been suggested that Nazi propaganda Minister Joseph Goebbels may have ordered the assassination to hide Arlozorov's connection with his wife).

Starting in 1934, the Revisionists also began organizing illegal immigration, and combined, the Jewish population of Palestine rose rapidly. While these conditions also led to increased Arab immigration, the rapid rise in Jewish immigrants eventually led to the 1936–1939 Arab revolt in Palestine.

By 1938, the increasing pressure put on European Jews also led mainstream Zionists to organize illegal immigration.

The Struggle Against Britain and the Nazis 1939–1948

The 1939 White Paper and the British break with Zionism

In Britain the 1930s, British Labour Party politician, Oswald Mosley, established a new party, the British Union of Fascists, which claimed that "the Jews" were leading Britain to war and campaigned for peace with Germany; however, his antisemitic remarks resulted in membership dropping to below 8,000 by the end of 1935 and, ultimately, Mosley shifted the party's focus back to mainstream politics before he was interned in 1940 and the BUF proscribed. British support for Zionism was undermined by the 1936–1939 Arab revolt in Palestine and concern that millions of Jews would soon be seeking entry to Palestine. The Nuremberg Laws effectively revoked the citizenship of the 500,000 Jews of Germany, making them refugees in their own country. In March 1938 Hitler annexed Austria, making its 200,000 Jews stateless refugees. In September the British agreed to Nazi annexation of the Sudetenland, making a further 100,000 Jews refugees.

In the absence of alternative destinations, over 100,000 German Jews headed for Palestine.

In 1939 the British issued a White Paper in which they declared that a Jewish National Home now existed and that their obligations under the mandate were fulfilled. Further migration would be harmful to the Arab population. A further 10,000 Jews a year were to be admitted from 1939 to 1944 as well as a one-time allowance of 25,000 in view of the situation in Europe. After that Jewish migration would require (the extremely unlikely) agreement of the Arab majority (by this time Jews were about one-third of the population). The British promised the Arabs independence by 1949 and imposed restrictions on land purchases by Jews.

The British were concerned about maintaining Arab support as Italian Fascist and German Nazi propaganda was targeting the Arab world (and winning support). Jewish support in the fight against Fascism was guaranteed. In Palestine, Zionists increasingly viewed the British as an enemy, but they deemed the fight against the Nazis more important. In 1940 a group led by Avraham Stern, later known as Lehi, left the Irgun over its refusal to fight the British.

State of the Zionist movement on the eve of World War II
In 1938–39 the Zionist movement had 1,040,540 members in 61 countries. Total world Jewish population at this time was about 16 million. Zionism was banned in Turkey and the USSR, which had well over 3 million Jews.

The following figures relate to the last pre-war Zionist congress in Geneva, 1939. Elections for the congress were held in 48 countries and 529 delegates attended. Members of the movement voted for the parties. Each party submitted a delegate list. Seats were distributed to the parties according to the number of votes they obtained and candidates elected in the order in which they were named on the list. This system today forms the basis for Israeli elections.

Zionism during the Holocaust

During the Holocaust Europe's Jews were cut off from and disowned by the outside world. Jews were systematically impoverished, starved and murdered. Where Jews did try to fight the Nazis, Zionists were prominent in the resistance. However those fighting never had a chance of success, and were always bloodily suppressed by the Nazis. The only instances where Jews had been successful, were when they fought in the woods as partisans, for example the Bielski partisans, a group of 1213 Jews who survived the whole war while making trouble for the Nazis. Nazi allies Hungary, Romania, Slovakia and Croatia (mainly Romania) were responsible for the deaths of at least 10% of the 6 million Jews killed in the Holocaust. Axis governments, local police forces and local volunteers across Europe played a critical role in rounding up or executing Jews for the Nazis.

The Warsaw Ghetto Uprising of January and April 1943 included the participation of both right- and left-leaning Zionist organizations. Its commander, Mordechai Anielewicz, was a Socialist-Zionist and Zionists of all political spectra played a leading role in the struggle. The uprising's left-leaning survivors eventually made their way to Palestine and founded two Kibbutzim, Lohamei HaGeta'ot and Yad Mordechai.

In Palestine the Zionist leadership instructed all able-bodied Jews to volunteer for the British Army. In addition there was an effort to parachute fighters into Europe, though little came of this. Fearing a Nazi invasion, the Jewish community prepared for a final stand to be made against the Nazis.

Overall the yishuv leaders had not done enough in publicizing and trying to stop the Holocaust. While they could have succeeded in saving thousands of Jews if rescuing Jews had been their top priority, rather than state creation, they had no power to "stop" the Holocaust. In the words of Tom Segev:
"The story of the yishuv leaders during the Holocaust was essentially one of helplessness. They rescued a few thousand Jews from Europe. They could, perhaps have saved more, but they could not save millions."
Efforts were made to offer the Nazis money for the release of Jews. However, these efforts were systematically (and, according to Segev, cynically) destroyed by the British.

The 1942 Zionist conference could not be held because of the war. Instead 600 Jewish leaders (not just Zionists) met at the Biltmore Hotel in New York and adopted a statement known as the Biltmore Program. They agreed that the Zionist movement would seek the creation of a Jewish state after the war and that all Jewish organizations would fight to ensure free Jewish migration into Palestine.

Impact of the Holocaust

The Nazi-inspired genocide in Europe had grave consequences for the Zionists.
A large section of the membership was wiped out. The damage was particularly great in Poland where about a third of the Zionist members had lived (the Russian membership had been lost to communism).
Those Jews who were not killed lost their possessions; the ability of the Zionist movement to raise money in Europe was severely reduced.

This calamity led to important changes in Jewish and Zionist politics:
Many Jews were now desperate to leave Europe and willing to take grave risks for that purpose
All Jews now agreed on the need for a Jewish state where Jews could live free of the fear of persecution and which would provide a haven in times of persecution.
The Jews of the USA were now the dominant force in Jewish politics.
More Jews were prepared to mobilize on behalf of their brethren.
Britain was now weakened and less able to resist international pressure.

The rapid growth of illegal immigration to Palestine

In 1945, President Truman sent a personal representative, Earl G. Harrison, to investigate the situation of the Jewish survivors ("Sh'erit ha-Pletah") in Europe. Harrison reported that
substantial unofficial and unauthorized movements of people must be expected, and these will require considerable force to prevent, for the patience of many of the persons involved is, and in my opinion with justification, nearing the breaking point. It cannot be overemphasized that many of these people are now desperate, that they have become accustomed under German rule to employ every possible means to reach their end, and that the fear of death does not restrain them.

Despite winning the 1945 British election with a manifesto promising to create a Jewish state in Palestine, the Labour Government succumbed to Foreign Office pressure and kept Palestine closed to Jewish migration.

In Europe former Jewish partisans led by Abba Kovner began to organize escape routes ("Berihah") taking Jews from Eastern Europe down to the Mediterranean where the Jewish Agency organized ships ("Aliyah Bet") to illegally carry them to Palestine.

The British government responded by trying to force Jews to return to their places of origin. Holocaust survivors entering the British Zone were denied assistance or forced to live in hostels with former Nazi collaborators (Britain gave asylum to a large number of Belorussian Nazi collaborators after the war). In American-controlled zones, political pressure from Washington allowed Jews to live in their own quarters and meant the US Army helped Jews trying to escape the centres of genocide.

Despite the death of almost a third of the world's Jews during the Second World War, the number of fee paying members of the Zionist movement continued to grow. The December 1946 Zionist congress in Basle (Switzerland) attracted 375 delegates from 43 countries representing two million fee paying members. As before the largest parties were the Socialist Zionist parties although these lacked a full majority. Only ten of the delegates were British Jews.

The 1947 UN decision to partition Palestine
In 1947 Britain announced its intention to withdraw from Palestine. A United Nations Special Committee investigated the situation and offered two solutions :
to establish a bi-national state in Palestine (the minority option);
to partition Palestine into a Jewish and an Arab state.

From the Zionist point of view, the second option corresponded to their goal and they gave full support to this.

On 29 November the United Nations General Assembly voted to partition Palestine into an Arab state and a Jewish state (with Jerusalem becoming an international enclave). Amid public rejoicing in Jewish communities in Palestine, the Jewish Agency accepted the plan. The Palestinian Arab leadership and the Arab League rejected the decision and announced that they would not abide by it. Civil conflict between the Arabs and Jews in Palestine ensued immediately.

Zionism after the creation of Israel

On 14 May 1948 the leaders of the Jewish community in Palestine declared independence in accordance with the UN resolution, and Israel was established as the Jewish state. This marked a major turning point, since the Zionist movement had accomplished its principal goal. As a result, many Zionist institutions became government institutions, and the three Zionist militias were combined to form the Israel Defense Forces.

David Ben-Gurion, the first prime minister of Israel objected to the Zionist Organization's more moderate approach in attaining Jewish statehood, and later objected to its continued existence, which he saw as competition and largely irrelevant following the formation of the state; he clashed with the leadership of the international Zionist Organization. The ZO's main activities at this point were relegated to assisting persecuted Jews, usually in countries where Zionism was illegal, and assisting immigration to Israel in countries where Jews faced little persecution, plus raising awareness and encouraging support for Israel.

Most Diaspora Jews identify with Zionism and have done so since the 1930s, in the sense that they support the State of Israel, even if they do not choose to emigrate; the Zionist movement also has undertaken a variety of roles to encourage support for Israel. These have included encouraging immigration and assisting immigrants in absorption and integration, fund-raising on behalf of needs and development, encouraging private capital investment, and mobilizing public opinion support for Israel internationally. Worldwide Jewish political and financial support has been of vital importance for Israel.

The 1967 war between Israel and the Arab states (the "Six-Day War") marked a major turning point in the history of both Israel and of Zionism. Israeli forces captured the eastern half of Jerusalem, including the holiest of Jewish religious sites, the Western Wall of the ancient Temple. They also took over the remaining territories of pre-1948 Palestine, the West Bank (from Jordan) the Gaza Strip (from Egypt) as well as the Golan Heights (from Syria).

The 28th Zionist Congress (Jerusalem, 1968) adopted the following five principles, known as the "Jerusalem Program", as the aims of contemporary Zionism:

The unity of the Jewish people and the centrality of Israel in Jewish life
The ingathering of the Jewish people in the historic homeland, Eretz Israel, through aliyah from all countries
The strengthening of the State of Israel, based on the "prophetic vision of justice and peace"
The preservation of the identity of the Jewish people through the fostering of Jewish, Hebrew and Zionist education and of Jewish spiritual and cultural values
The protection of Jewish rights everywhere.

The election of 1977, characterized as "the revolution", brought the nationalistic, right-wing, Revisionist Zionist, Likud Party to power, after thirty years in opposition to the dominant Labor party and indicated further movement to the political right. Joel Greenburg, writing in The New York Times twenty years after the election, notes its significance and that of related events; he writes:

The seed was sown in 1977, when Menachem Begin of Likud brought his party to power for the first time in a stunning election victory over Labor. A decade before, in the 1967 war, Israeli troops had in effect undone the partition accepted in 1948 by overrunning the West Bank and Gaza Strip. Ever since, Mr. Begin had preached undying loyalty to what he called Judea and Samaria (the West Bank lands) and promoted Jewish settlement there. But he did not annex the West Bank and Gaza to Israel after he took office, reflecting a recognition that absorbing the Palestinians could turn Israel it into a binational state instead of a Jewish one.

Control of the West Bank and Gaza placed Israel in the position of control over a large population of Palestinian Arabs. Over the years this has generated conflict between competing core Zionist ideals of an egalitarian democratic state on the one hand, and territorial loyalty to historic Jewish areas, particularly the old city of Jerusalem, on the other. Zionism and its ideological underpinnings have become less important in Israeli politics, except for the ongoing national debate about what is meant by a "Jewish State", and the geographic limits of the State of Israel. These debates however, have largely taken place outside Zionist organizations, and within Israeli national politics.

In 1975 the United Nations General Assembly Resolution 3379 was passed. It stated that "zionism is a form of racism and racial discrimination." Resolution 3379 was rescinded in 1991 by the Resolution 4686.

In 2001, the first ever environmental Zionist organization, the Green Zionist Alliance, was founded by a group of American and Israeli environmentalists led by Dr. Alon Tal, Rabbi Michael Cohen and Dr. Eilon Schwartz. The Green Zionist Alliance focuses on the environment of Israel and its region.

Immigration from Iraq

In 1941, a pro-Nazi coup in Iraq led to a massacre of Jews in Baghdad (where they were the largest ethnic group and formed 40% of the population).  With anti-Semitism growing, particularly following Iraqi independence, over a 1,000 Jews were illegally fleeing Iraq for Palestine every month. In March 1950, the Iraqi government announced that for a period of 9 months it would permit Jews to leave. Over 98% of the 130,000 Iraqi Jews opted to move to Israel (they were flown from Iran). Many of them abandoning substantial property which was expropriated by the Iraqi government.

The campaign to free the Jews of the USSR

In the late 1940s, the USSR became increasingly anti-Jewish and accusations of Zionism were frequently used as a euphemism for anti-Jewish campaigns in Eastern Europe and the Arab world.

Soviet propaganda backfired in 1967 and led to a major spurt of Jews applying to leave for Israel. The Zionist movement mounted a major campaign to pressure the USSR to allow Soviet Jews to migrate to Israel. Zionist activists in the USSR studied Hebrew (illegal in the USSR), held clandestine religious ceremonies (circumcision was illegal) and monitored Human Rights abuses on behalf of western organizations. The most prominent activist was Anatoly Sharansky, who was sentenced to 13 years in prison for his actions before being exchanged for a Soviet spy.

Over the years a number of Israeli and American Jewish organizations, most notably SSSJ and NCSJ, mounted a political campaign to free Soviet Jews. Aided with the efforts of Reagan administration, this campaign eventually succeeded in 1987 when most refusniks were released from prison and allowed to emigrate to Israel.

Further reading
 Brenner, Michael, and Shelley Frisch. Zionism: A Brief History (2003) excerpt and text search
 Cohen, Naomi. The Americanization of Zionism, 1897–1948 (2003). 304 pp. essays on specialized topics
 Laqueuer, Walter. A History of Zionism: From the French Revolution to the Establishment of the State of Israel (2003) good history by a leading scholar excerpt and text search
 
 Sachar, Howard M. A History of Israel: From the Rise of Zionism to Our Time (2007) excerpt and text search
 Urofsky, Melvin I. American Zionism from Herzl to the Holocaust (1995), the standard history
 Wigoder, Geoffrey, ed. New Encyclopedia of Zionism and Israel (2nd ed. 2 vol. 1994); 1521pp

Primary sources
 Hertzberg, Arthur. The Zionist Idea: A Historical Analysis and Reader (1997), 648 pp, major primary sources plus very good introduction

See also

Types of Zionism
Christian Zionism
Cultural Zionism
General Zionists
Labor Zionism
Reform Zionism
Religious Zionism
Revisionist Zionism
Secular Zionism

Zionist institutions and organizations
Histadrut
The Jewish Agency for Israel
Jewish National Fund
Vaad Leumi
World Zionist Organization

History of Zionism, Israel and Palestine
History of Israel
History of Palestine
History of the Southern Levant
Israeli–Palestinian conflict
List of Zionist figures
Timeline of Zionism

Other
Anti-Zionism
Jewish Autonomism
Jewish emancipation
Yerida

Footnotes

References
Taylor, A.R., 1971, "Vision and intent in Zionist Thought", in The transformation of Palestine, ed. by I. Abu-Lughod, Northwestern university press, Evanston, USA
David Hazony, Yoram Hazony, and Michael B. Oren, eds., New Essays on Zionism, Shalem Press, 2007.

External links

 Zionism
Official website of the Central Zionist Archives

 
Articles containing video clips